Coleophora corsicella is a moth of the family Coleophoridae. It is found from France to Italy and Greece and from Slovakia to the Iberian Peninsula.

The larvae feed on Agrostemma, Lychnis viscaria, Silene italica and Silene viscosa. They create a tubular silken case scattered with rows of detritus fragments.

References

corsicella
Moths described in 1898
Moths of Europe